HAT-P-6 also named Sterrennacht is a star in the constellation Andromeda, located approximately 895 light years or 274 parsecs away from the Earth. It is an F-type star, implying that it is hotter and more massive than the Sun. The apparent magnitude of the star is +10.54, which means that it can only be visible through the telescope. The absolute magnitude of +3.36 is brighter than the Sun's +4.83, meaning that the star itself is brighter than the Sun. A search for a binary companion star using adaptive optics at the MMT Observatory turned out negative.

The name Sterrennacht (Starry Night) was selected in the NameExoWorlds held by the IAU after a painting by Van Gogh.

Planetary system
The companion planet HAT-P-6b is a transiting planet discovered on October 15, 2007 by the HATNet Project. The planet's true mass is slightly more than Jupiter at only 5.7%, but the radius is 33% greater, making the planet's density of 0.45 g/cm3. Its large size compared to mass comes from the great amount of heat received from the nearby star that expands the planet's atmosphere, categorizing as "hot Jupiter". The orbital period is 3.852985 days and the distance from its star is 0.05235 AU. The inclination of the orbit with respect to the stellar rotation axis is roughly 166º.

See also
 HAT-P-4
 HAT-P-5
 List of extrasolar planets

References

External links
 Image NAME+HAT-P-6

F-type main-sequence stars
Planetary transit variables
Andromeda (constellation)
Planetary systems with one confirmed planet